The Birmingham Gun Barrel Proof House is a weapons proving establishment in Banbury Street, Birmingham, UK. The building was designed by John Horton and consists of a centre bay, emphasised by a segmental parapet, which contains trophies by William Hollins. A Jacobean-style gateway was added in 1883. It is a grade II* listed building.

The Proof House (originally The Guardians, Trustee, and Wardens of the Gun Barrel Proof House of the Town of Birmingham) was established in 1813 by an act of Parliament at the request—and expense—of the then prosperous Birmingham gun trade. The corporation was renamed to "The Guardians of the Birmingham Proof House" by the Gun Barrel Proof Act 1855. Its remit was to provide a testing and certification service for firearms in order to prove their quality of construction, particularly in terms of the resistance of barrels to explosion under firing conditions. Such testing prior to sale or transfer of firearms is made mandatory by the Gun Barrel Proof Act 1868 (31 & 32 Vict. c. cxiii), which made it an offence to sell, offer for sale, transfer, export or pawn an unproofed firearm, with certain exceptions for military organisations.

The proof process is that of testing a firearm for integrity using a severely overcharged cartridge, or proof load which is fired through the gun in an armoured testing chamber. This exposes it to pressures far beyond what it would experience in normal service. It is awarded a stamped proof mark if it survives without either being destroyed or suffering damage from the proof load. Larger guns were tested at a shooting range in Bordesley along a railway viaduct; however, the expansion of the city centre resulted in the closure of the shooting range.

Proof may be rendered invalid if the firearm is damaged or modified significantly; at this point it is described as "out of proof" and must be re-proved before it can be sold or transferred. Note that the correct term for a satisfactorily tested firearm is proved, or proven.

There are penalties for non-compliance with proof laws; a fine of £5,000 may be levied for selling an unproofed or out-of proof firearm, more if a number of firearms are involved in a transaction. Tampering with, or forging, a proof mark is regarded as even more serious.

The Proof House still exists today, largely unchanged in both purpose and construction, although it offers a wider range of services including ammunition testing and firearm accident investigation. The building contains a museum of arms and ammunition, and can be visited by prior arrangement.

See also
 Birmingham Gun Quarter

References

External links
Birmingham Gun Barrel Proof House

Museums in Birmingham, West Midlands
Grade II* listed buildings in Birmingham
Military and war museums in England